Johannes Adrianus Menne Warren (20 October 1921, in Borssele – 19 December 2001, in Goes) was a Dutch writer. Much of his fame in the Netherlands derives from having published a collection of diaries in which he described his life and homosexual experiences in a country that deeply repressed homosexuality. He is also known for his poetry, his literary criticism, and his translations of poetry from Modern Greek.

Youth
Warren was born in Zeeland, the only child of an engineer and a school teacher. As a child, he had few friendships among his peers, and when he was a student at the lyceum in Goes developed a great interest in nature. After graduation, he began writing articles for nature magazines, and was especially interested in birds. Jac. P. Thijsse was his model. For a while, he worked as a volunteer at an institute for dialectology. Even before the start of World War II, he began keeping a diary.

Writing career
After the war, Warren began publishing: in 1946, he published Pastorale, a collection of poetry; in 1947, a study on Jac. P. Thijsse; and in 1949 a book on nocturnal birds. In 1951, he began to write reviews and literary criticism for the Provinciale Zeeuwse Courant, one of the foremost newspapers in Zeeland. He wrote these columns and reviews until his death.

Marriage years
In 1952 he married an English woman, and they had three children. Soon after their marriage his wife was offered a position in Paris, where Warren's repressed homosexual feelings found an outlet in many contacts with North African boys. Although this created tension in his marriage, it also sparked his poetic career: Warren published three collections of poetry during his years in Paris, and the marriage, in the end, lasted until 1978.

Creative period
In 1958 the family returned to Zeeland, and Warren produced little writing until the end of the 1960s, when the publishing company Bert Bakker published a collection of new poems by Warren, Tussen hybris en vergaan. In 1969 Warren met Gerrit Komrij and the two poets began a long and mutually inspiring friendship. During the next ten years, Warren published a new book of poetry every year.

In 1978 Warren met Mario Molegraaf, forty years his junior (Warren was 57 at that time). The two began a tumultuous love affair that lasted until Warren's death. Molegraaf was a talented writer himself, and together they published a number of translations: the entire work of Constantine P. Cavafy, several poems by George Seferis, works by Plato and Epicurus, and the four gospels.

Secret Diary and other publications
The publication of his series of diaries caused some concern among Warren's friends and colleagues: as the title implies, the diaries are quite frank. Warren openly describes his own life and experiences, and offers his opinions on everyone, including his friends. The twentieth volume covered the years 1996 to 1998, with one more volume to be published.

From 1985 until 2002, Meulenhoff published a Warren calendar with a poem each day. Together with Molegraaf, Warren published several popular poetry anthologies.

Death and afterlife
Warren died at age 80 of liver problems; even his final year is described in his diary (which he kept until three days before his death) and in that of Molegraaf (published in 2002). In 2004, two novels he wrote in 1950 (Een vriend voor de schemering and Om het behoud der eenzaamheid) were rediscovered; Een vriend voor de schemering was published in 2005. A movie based on his novel Steen der hulp is in production.

Awards
 1958 – Lucy B. en C.W. van der Hoogtprijs for Saïd
 1970 – Pierre Bayle-prijs for his literary criticism
 1971 – Zeeuwse prijs voor Kunsten en Wetenschappen for his entire oeuvre
 1981 – Culture award from the city Goes for Geheim dagboek and his weekly literary reviews in the Provinciale Zeeuwse Courant

Bibliography

Poetry
 1946 – Pastorale
 1951 – Eiland in de stroom
 1954 – Leeuw lente
 1954 – Vijf in je oog
 1957 – Saïd
 1966 – Een roos van Jericho
 1969 – Tussen hybris en vergaan
 1970 – Kritieken
 1972 – Schetsen uit het Hongaarse volksleven
 1972 – Verzamelde gedichten 1941–1971
 1973 – De Olympos
 1974 – Betreffende vogels
 1974 – Een liefdeslied
 1974 – Herakles op de tweesprong
 1975 – 't Zelve anders
 1975 – Winter in Pompeï
 1976 – Demetrios
 1976 – Sperma en tranen
 1976 – Zeggen wat nooit iemand zei
 1976 – Zeven gedichten van liefde
 1978 – De vondst in het wrak
 1978 – Een otter in Americain
 1978 – Behalve linde, tamarinde en banaan (revised edition of Sperma en tranen)
 1978 – Voor Mario
 1981 – Verzamelde gedichten 1941–1981
 1982 – Dit is werkelijk voor jou geschreven (self-selected anthology)
 1986 – Bij Marathon
 1986 – Tijd
 1987 – Ik ging naar de geheime kamers
 1989 – Binnenste buiten
 1992 – Nakijken, dromen, derven
 1993 – Indigo
 1996 – Ik ging naar de Noordnol
 2001 – De Oost
 2001 – Een stip op de wereldkaart

Prose fiction
 1975 – Steen der hulp (tweede druk 1983; trans. in English as Secretly Inside
 2004 – Tussen Borssele en Parijs
 2005 – Een vriend voor de schemering

Non-fiction
 1947 – In memoriam Dr. Jac. P. Thijsse
 1949 – Nachtvogels
 1981 – Geheim dagboek 1942–
 1987 – Het dagboek als kunstvorm
 1993 – Geheim dagboek 1939–1940
 2001 – Om het behoud der eenzaamheid (selections from Geheim dagboek)

Anthologies
 1959 – Mijn hart wou nergens tieren (bloemlezing uit het werk van P.C. Boutens)
 1980 – Spiegel van de Nederlandse poëzie (revised edition 1984)

References

External links
Hans Warren in the Digital Library, Bibliotheek voor de Nederlandse Letteren
Website dedicated to Hans Warren
Collection Hans Warren in the Zeeuwse Bibliotheek
Photographs by Hans Warren in Beeldbank Zeeland

1921 births
2001 deaths
Dutch male poets
Dutch LGBT poets
People from Borsele
Gay poets
20th-century Dutch poets
20th-century Dutch male writers
20th-century Dutch LGBT people